Peter Logan (1877-1957) was a Scottish footballer.

Born in Glasgow, Logan started his career with Motherwell before moving to Notts County in 1898. He spent a single season there before moving to Woolwich Arsenal in May 1899. He was an immediate first-team regular at inside right, displacing Jack Aston and playing 23 league games; his debut came in a First Division game against Leicester Fosse on 2 September 1899.

Logan left Arsenal in the summer of 1900 to join Reading of the Southern League but returned to Woolwich Arsenal a year later. His second spell at Arsenal was shorter and less successful; he only played five league games before losing his place to Bill Gooing. He left Arsenal for Brentford in November 1901; in total he made 29 appearances for Arsenal, scoring 7 goals.

References

Footballers from Glasgow
Scottish footballers
Association football forwards
Motherwell F.C. players
Notts County F.C. players
Arsenal F.C. players
Reading F.C. players
Brentford F.C. players
1877 births
1957 deaths
English Football League players